Robert John Smyth (born 22 February 1977) is an English rugby league footballer.

He played for Wigan Warriors, London Broncos, Warrington Wolves and Leigh Centurions (Heritage № 1224) in the Super League.

While playing at London Broncos in 1999, Smyth kicked two conversions at Wembley in the Challenge Cup Final defeat by Leeds Rhinos.

Smyth was an Ireland international.

References

External links

 (archived by web.archive.org) Leigh profile
 (archived by web.archive.org) Statistics at slstats.org
 Statistics at rugbyleagueproject.org

1977 births
Living people
Chorley Lynx players
English people of Irish descent
English rugby league players
Ireland national rugby league team players
Leigh Leopards players
London Broncos players
Rugby league wingers
Rugby league players from Wigan
Warrington Wolves players
Wigan Warriors players